Home of Peace Cemetery, also known as Navai Shalome, is a Jewish cemetery established in 1889, and is located at 1299 El Camino Real in Colma, California. The cemetery contains the Emanu-El Mausoleum, owned by and serving the Congregation Emanu-El of San Francisco. It is one of four Jewish cemeteries near the city of San Francisco and it shares an adjacent space next to the Hills of Eternity Memorial Park (also a Jewish cemetery, and also founded in 1889).

History 

Emanu-El Hart (or the "Old Jewish Cemetery") was built in 1847 at Gough Street and Vallejo Street in San Francisco; by 1860 the remains were relocated to an area that is now Mission Dolores Park and this served as a cemetery for the Congregation Emanu-El and the Congregation Sherith Israel. When the city of San Francisco started to see dramatic growth in population; it was decided to move the cemetery outside of the city to Colma and they established Home of Peace Cemetery and Hills of Eternity Memorial Park with each cemetery served a different congregation.

Notable burials 

 Aaron Fleishhacker (1820–1898),  Kingdom of Bavaria-born American businessman; founded paper box manufacturer, A. Fleishhacker & Co.
Herbert Fleishhacker (1872–1957), businessman, civic leader and philanthropist.
Abraham Haas (1847–1921), Kingdom of Bavaria-born American businessman, co-founder of the Hellman, Haas & Co.
 Alfred Hertz (1872–1942), Prussian-born conductor.
 Florence Prag Kahn (1866–1948), teacher, politician, and the first Jewish woman to serve in the United States Congress.
 Julius Kahn (1861–1924), Grand Duchy of Baden-born American politician, United States Congressman.
Simon Koshland (1825–1896), Kingdom of Bavaria-born American businessman, and wool merchant.
 Charles Lane (1905–2007), actor, appearing in many Frank Capra films.
Philip N. Lilienthal (1849–1908), banker and philanthropist; initially interred at the family vault at Home of Peace Cemetery and later moved to Salem Fields Cemetery, in Brooklyn, New York.
Martin A. Meyer (1879–1923), rabbi
 Joseph Owades (1919–2005), biochemist and brewer of light and industrially produced beer.
Ignatz Steinhart (1840–1917), banker, entrepreneur, philanthropist; namesake of the former Steinhart Aquarium in San Francisco.
 Levi Strauss (1829–1902), German Confederation-born American businessman; founder of Levi Strauss & Co. and the first blue jeans.
 Adolph Sutro (1830–1898), Prussian-born American engineer, politician and philanthropist; served as the 24th mayor of San Francisco from 1895 until 1897.
 Walter Wanger (1894–1968), film producer.
 James David Zellerbach (1892–1963), businessman, United States diplomat and ambassador.

See also 
 List of cemeteries in California
 Bereavement in Judaism

References 

Cemeteries in San Mateo County, California
History of San Mateo County, California
1889 establishments in California
Jewish cemeteries in California
Protected areas of San Mateo County, California